Family Talk is an album by Muhal Richard Abrams released on the Italian Black Saint label in 1993 and features performances of six of Abrams compositions by Abrams, Jack Walrath, Patience Higgins, Brad Jones, Warren Smith and Reggie Nicholson.

Reception
The Allmusic review by Scott Yanow awarded the album 4½ stars stating "This CD has such intriguing writing by Muhal Richard Abrams for his sextet that the group sounds like an orchestra at times... This is one of Muhal Richard Abrams' better-known combo sessions." The Penguin Guide to Jazz awarded the album 3½ stars calling it "A fine record which transcends individual contributions".

Track listing
All compositions by Muhal Richard Abrams
 "Meditation 1" - 4:35
 "Drumbutu" - 17:21
 "DizBirdMonkBudMax (A Tribute)" - 15:48
 "FamilyTalk" - 13:47
 "Illuso" - 15:15
 "Sound Image of the Past, Present and Future" - 5:19
Recorded February 26–27 & March 1, 1993 at Sear Sound, New York City

Personnel
Jack Walrath - trumpet
Patience Higgins - bass clarinet, tenor saxophone, English horn
Brad Jones - bass
Warren Smith - vibes, timpani, marimba, gongs
Reggie Nicholson - drums, marimba, bells
Muhal Richard Abrams - piano, synthesizer, conductor

References

1993 albums
Muhal Richard Abrams albums
Black Saint/Soul Note albums